Perth railway station is the largest station on the Transperth network, serving the central business district of Perth, Western Australia. It serves as an interchange between the Airport, Armadale, Fremantle, Joondalup, Mandurah and Midland lines as well as Transwa's Australind service.

History

Establishment

The foundation stone for the original Richard Roach Jewell-designed Perth station was laid on 10 May 1880, with the station opening on 1 March 1881 as part of the Eastern Railway from Fremantle to Guildford. The station had one through platform with a terminating dock platform at the east end; however it soon proved to be inadequate for the growing railway, and after the opening of the Armadale line in 1889 put further stress on the facility it was decided that a larger station would be built.

The new, larger Victorian Free Classical style station building, designed by George Temple-Poole, was opened south of the original station in 1894, with the old building demolished and replaced by a new island platform. The new station building, still in use today, has been expanded numerous times since being built, including the addition of two wings at the east and west ends of the building. A planned third storey and clocktower were never built. A collection of freight and administrative offices and tearooms were also part of the railway station complex. The station initially had the Barrack Street and William Street bridges as limiting factors to its further development, though platforms to the west of the station that ran underneath the Horseshoe Bridge were eventually constructed.

The station was the centre of the Western Australian Government Railways system, with most regional trains originating from the station, and it also served as the headquarters of the agency until 1976. Following the cessation of most regional services, the completion of standard gauge tracks to East Perth station, and the relocation of most administrative offices to the Westrail Centre, by the late 1970s Perth station remained only as a terminus for The Australind service to Bunbury, as well as an interchange for Transperth's suburban services.

The railway building has at times housed various commercial operations as well as police offices. The WA Craft Council was a tenant in the 1980s. For a considerable length of time the forecourt area was used for car parking, though this is now very limited except for official vehicles.

Later development

As early as the 1950s, there were moves and suggestions for the redevelopment of the station area. Starting in 1988 the station underwent a major upgrade as part of the Northern Suburbs Transit System project, which included the construction of a new island platform, a steel and glass roof that covered the central platforms, an adjoining multi-storey car park, and the Citiplace Centre retail and community services hub built on a level above the existing station platforms which also connected pedestrian footbridges linking the Perth Cultural Centre and the Forrest Chase shopping complex to the station.

In 1992, a ninth platform was added along with a pedestrian overpass at the extreme west end of the station which allowed direct access to the railway station from Wellington Street bus station and Northbridge. With the introduction of the SmartRider contactless electronic ticketing system and installation of fare gates, Perth railway station became a closed station in early 2007; as a result the entrance on the Horseshoe Bridge was fenced off and its wooden stairway and overpass was later removed.

As part of the New MetroRail project, the station was refurbished and expanded with new underground platforms built at a 90-degree angle to the existing platforms beneath Gordon Stephenson House to the east of William Street, between Wellington and Murray Streets. The underground platforms, numbered 1 and 2, are known as Perth Underground, but are considered part of the overall Perth station. The underground platforms are linked to the original Perth station via a walkway under Wellington Street; a new entrance to Perth Underground was also constructed at the west end of the Murray Street pedestrian mall. The new platforms opened on 15 October 2007.

Further changes to the station occurred as part of the Perth City Link project in the early-2010s, which saw the above ground rail lines west of the Horseshoe Bridge sunk and the existing platforms and overpass there demolished to make way for a new public space, Yagan Square. This reduced the above ground platforms from nine to seven. The station also saw the construction of a new pedestrian underpass connecting the three main above ground platforms, and upgrades and extensions to the roof.

In September 2013, a new Platform 9 on the Roe Street side of the station opened. This new platform was temporarily used for special event services until mid-December 2013, before becoming part of the Midland line.

Plaques formerly in entrance area to station
The railway station entrance area had plaques to commemorate the following events:
1 March 1981 – centenary of Fremantle to Guildford railway
14 November 1989 – Perth to Joondalup railway first spike driven
28 September 1991 – introduction of electric trains
11 April 1992 – commissioning of electric train services
25 March 1994 – centenary of railway station

Platforms & services

Platforms currently in use are as follows:

It received Airport line services on 9 October 2022.

Transport links
Several Transperth bus routes stop adjacent to Perth station. Buses also operate from the nearby Perth Busport, and rail replacement services also depart from the nearby Perth Busport.

References

Further reading
 Has photos of earlier forms of the stationpage 55 for example.

External links

Station front in November 1936 Curtin University
Vintage aerial photograph by Frank Hurley at the National Library of Australia

Armadale and Thornlie lines
George Temple-Poole buildings
Fremantle line
Joondalup line
Mandurah line
Midland line, Perth
Railway stations in Perth, Western Australia
Railway stations in Australia opened in 1881
Romanesque Revival architecture in Australia
Wellington Street, Perth
Listed railway stations in Australia
Railway stations located underground in Perth, Western Australia
State Register of Heritage Places in the City of Perth
Airport line, Perth